101 Dalmatians: The Series is an American animated television series that aired from September 1, 1997 to March 4, 1998 on the Disney-Kellogg Alliance and ABC. It is produced by Walt Disney Television Animation and Jumbo Pictures and is based on the 1961 Disney animated feature of the same name and its 1996 live-action remake. It features the voices of Pamela Adlon, Debi Mae West, Kath Soucie and Tara Strong, and is the first television series based on the 101 Dalmatians franchise; it was followed by 101 Dalmatian Street in 2019.

Many staff members previously worked on the Timon & Pumbaa television show, Doug creator Jim Jinkins and his partner David Campbell both were developers of the series.

Premise
The show focuses primarily on three particular puppies; Lucky, TV addict leader and unconventional hero, Rolly, his fat cheerful laid-back and always-hungry brother, and Cadpig, their uncanny but loveable sister who is the runt of the family. The three siblings are often joined by Spot, a chicken who wants to be a dog and a member of the Bark Brigade. Early promotional material had listed dictatorial Penny and mischievous Patch as two other puppy cast members, but the highlighted puppies were whittled down to three so Penny was dropped and Patch became extra in the show. Unlike the original film but like the 1996 live-action film, the series is set in the United States in the 1990s, on the Dearly Farm.

Other puppies appearing in the show have included the fearless, three-legged Tripod, the friendly dim-witted Dipstick, the constantly urinating Wizzer, the fashion-conscious diva Two-Tone, and the Sheepdog mix, Mooch, who serves as the farm's bully. Patch also makes occasional appearances, though with a different personality than originally promoted. The show seems to be a blending of both the animated film and the live-action film, so the potential exists for other puppies from the films to appear, especially Freckles, Pepper, Penny, Jewel, and Fidget.

Characters

Main
Lucky (voiced by Pamela Adlon and Debi Mae West) is the most plucky of the puppies and is unique in having his only spots in the shape of a horseshoe on his back. He is the leader of the main pups and is very adventurous and determined to do whatever he thinks is right. However, he is very obsessed with TV, and he's usually the one at fault when the main pups get into trouble.
Cadpig (voiced by Kath Soucie) is the runt of the litter and the smallest of the puppies but quite possibly the most intelligent, if not deluded somewhat by her abstract state of mind. She is unique in having long floppy ears, a big head, a kind-hearted personality, and she's also quite strong for her size and can have a very strong temper as well.
Rolly (voiced by Kath Soucie) is the very hungry one. Almost all his decisions are based on food and this, at times, gets him and the pups into trouble. However, he is a cheerful and diligent sibling, especially when it comes to his incredible sense of smell. He's also very timid and is an easy target for bullies due to him being such a foodie.
Spot (voiced by Tara Strong) is a chicken who wants to become a Dalmatian. She is the most intelligent of the main four and is a voice of reason for the foursome, but is more often than not ignored. She is easily scared and is prone to literally bouncing off the walls. She is, however, a great dancer which has to count for something, according to her and appears to be good at math. She is also able to fly to some extent. In certain episodes, she acts as a private investigator and sports an alter-ego by the name of Pullet Marlowe.
Roger (voiced by Jeff Bennett) and Anita Dearly (voiced by Kath Soucie, respectively) are owners of the 101 Dalmatians and Dearly Farm.
Cruella De Vil (voiced by April Winchell and Tress MacNeille in 2 episodes) Now a corporate criminal and most of her plans revolve around getting richer, tormenting the Dalmatians, and plotting to steal the Dearly Farm. Her main catchphrase in the series is "Memo to myself," followed by whatever her current scheme is or sometimes her emotional state, uttered into her personal recording device. This often occurs more than once an episode.
Horace (voiced by David L. Lander) and Jasper (voiced by Michael McKean) are Cruella's henchmen. They are usually hired to perform her plans, usually failing due to their lack of intelligence.

Supporting Main
Nanny (voiced by Charlotte Rae) is Dearlys' caretaker who always helps Roger and Anita around the Dearly Farm, also helps with feeding the Dalmatians from the huge Chow Tower that she operates with a bike.
Pongo (voiced by Kevin Schon) is the father of the fifteen puppies, adopted father of the eighty-four orphaned pups, and the husband of Perdita. He is Roger's devoted pet.
Perdita (voiced by Pam Dawber) is the mother of the Dalmatians, and the wife of Pongo. She is mother to the fifteen puppies, and adoptive mother to eighty-four orphaned pups. She is Anita's beloved pet.
Mooch (voiced by Danny Cooksey) is an adolescent Sheepdog mix who is the bully of the farm. He can be intimidating at times, but deep down he is very sensitive and nice.
Two-Tone (voiced by Tara Strong) is one of the Dalmatian puppies and Mooch's former girlfriend and second-in-command. She is depicted as half black with white spots, and half white with black spots. She's a tomboy who loves fashion and has a crush on Lucky.
Dipstick (voiced by Thom Adcox-Hernandez) is a male Dalmatian puppy who is the most dimwitted of Mooch's gang.  He's constantly infested with fleas. In some episodes, he is shown to have a soft side.
Wizzer (voiced by Pamela Adlon in "Purred It Through the Grapevine" and Christine Cavanaugh for the rest of the series) is a male Dalmatian puppy and bladder control issues who is part of Mooch's gang.
Tripod (voiced by Toran Caudell) is a male Dalmatian puppy who serves as Lucky's friendly rival. He has spotted ears, a green headband and is missing his front left leg.
Scorch (voiced by Frank Welker) is Cruella's pet ferret who has an appetite for Spot.
The Colonel (voiced by Jim Cummings) is an Old English Sheepdog and commanding officer of the Bark Brigade.
Sergeant Tibbs (voiced by Jeff Bennett) is a cat and trusted ally to the Colonel.
Captain (voiced by Frank Welker) is a horse on the Dearly Farm who is usually seen helping Nanny.
Lieutenant Pug (voiced by Jeff Bennett) is one of the training officers of the Bark Brigade. He is paranoid about a potential feline invasion. He gets very brutal with the main pups and has a habit of insulting them, but he also suffers from narcolepsy.
Thunderbolt (voiced by Frank Welker) is a German Shepherd and Lucky's favorite superhero.
Cornelia (voiced by Tress MacNeille) is Spot's overprotective mother who wants her to behave like a chicken.
Lucy (voiced by Paddi Edwards) is a goose who gets grumpy when the Dalmatians play in her pond at Hiccup Hole.
Swamp Rat (voiced by Jeff Bennett) is a rat salesman who lives in the swamp.
Steven the Alligator (voiced by Frank Welker) is Swamp Rat's associate who is also fixated on eating Spot.
Cydne (voiced by Frank Welker) is a snake who lives in the swamp and Swamp Rat's other associate.
Mayor Ed Pig (voiced by Jim Cummings) is a pig who is also the mayor of the animals on the Dearly Farm.
Dumpling (voiced by Christine Cavanaugh) is Mayor Ed's daughter who has an unrequited crush on Lucky.
Princess (voiced by April Winchell in "The High Price of Fame" and "Shake, Rattle and Woof" and Cree Summer for the rest of the series) is a cow who lives on the Dearly Farm.
Duchess (voiced by Marla Gibbs) is a cow and a companion of Princess.

Release

Broadcast
The show debuted in syndication on the Disney-Kellogg Alliance block on September 1, 1997, running episodes five days a week; this was the second season. Two weeks later, the first season aired on ABC's One Saturday Morning programing block. That season was originally going to air on ABC on September 6, 1997, but was delayed a week due to the untimely death of Princess Diana.

In total, 65 half-hour episodes with 105 episode segments were produced. The first season contained 12 episodes: 3 full-length episodes, and 9 that contained 2 segments each. Meanwhile, the second season contained 53 episodes: 22 full-length episodes, and 31 that contained 2 segments each. On March 4, 1998, the show aired its last episode with reruns continuing to play in syndication through August 28, 1998.

Reruns continued to play on ABC until 1999.  Reruns of the show also aired on Disney Channel from 1998 to 1999 and Toon Disney from September 1, 1998 to March 9, 2007.

On March 23, 2012, the show returned to television as a launch title for the Disney Junior channel, but, like Timon & Pumbaa, only about half of the episodes aired, and most of the ones that did air were edited down (this was most likely due to scenes that were dubbed inappropriate for preschoolers). On September 3, 2013, the series was removed from Disney Junior's lineup.

Home media
While the series as a whole never made a true home media release either on VHS or DVD, the episode, "A Christmas Cruella", was released on VHS in 1998, which also contained the episode "Coup De Vil" as a bonus episode.  This was also released on DVD in the UK.

The 3-part series finale, "Dalmatian Vacation", was also released on VHS and Laserdisc in Japan, which included two songs that were exclusive to this release and not on the TV broadcasts of the trilogy of episodes.

Streaming
Currently, all of the episodes are available on the iTunes Store and Amazon Prime Video since February 2017 in HD and SD formats, with the exception of "Alive N' Chicken"/"Prima Doggy".

On May 8, 2020, the entire series became available on Disney+ in Australia, and on the US version of Disney+ on June 19, 2020, with all 65 episodes arranged in release date order, listed as one season. In addition, "Alive N' Chicken"/"Prima Doggy" is among the episodes available to stream, a rare instance from Disney+ for a television series that is available to purchase digitally elsewhere, but for a particular episode that was banned, being available to stream on the platform.

Episodes

Series overview

Season 1 (1997–1998)

Season 2 (1997–1998)

Notes

References

External links

Series
1997 American television series debuts
1998 American television series endings
1990s American animated television series
1990s animated comedy television series
American children's animated adventure television series
American children's animated comedy television series
American children's animated fantasy television series
American sequel television series
Animated television series about dogs
Animated television series about siblings
American television shows based on children's books
English-language television shows
American Broadcasting Company original programming
Disney Channel original programming
The Disney Afternoon
ABC Kids (TV programming block)
First-run syndicated television programs in the United States
Impact of the September 11 attacks on television
Television shows set on farms
Television shows set in the United States
Television series set in the 1990s
Television series based on Disney films
Television series based on adaptations
Television series by Disney Television Animation